Mir Yazdanbakhsh was a chieftain of the Behsud Hazaras in the Hazarajat of central Afghanistan in the 19th century. Son of Mir Wali Beg, he was born in 1790.

He expelled his older brother, Mir Muhammad Shah after his father was assassinated by a minor chief. He consolidated his power to become undisputed chief of the Hazaras (?-1832)

Yazdanbakhsh was a powerful figure in Behsud (in modern Wardak Province), who controlled the Shibar and Hajigak passes into Bamiyan. His great power concerned Dost Muhammad Khan, who lured him to Kabul and imprisoned him.  Yazdanbakhsh managed to escape, or pay a ransom, and returned to Behsud, where he continued to control the Bamiyan routes and submit revenues to Kabul. He was assassinated in Bamiyan.

Sources 
Christine Noelle .  State and tribe in nineteenth-century Afghanistan: the reign of Amir Dost Muhammad Khan (1826-1863). Routledge, 1997. , .

References 

Hazara people
History of Maidan Wardak Province
1790 births
1832 deaths